The Roman Catholic Diocese of Gómez Palacio is located in Mexico.  It is a suffragan diocese of the Archdiocese of Durango from which it was erected by Pope Benedict XVI in 2008.

Ordinaries
José Guadalupe Torres Campos (2008–2014), appointed Bishop of Ciudad Juárez, Chihuahua
José Fortunato Álvarez Valdéz (2015-2018)
Jorge Estrada Solórzano (2019-)

Episcopal See
Gómez Palacio, Durango

External links and references

Gomez Palacio
Gomez Palacio, Roman Catholic Diocese of
Gomez Palacio
Gomez Palacio